Solla  is a village in the Binah Prefecture in the Kara Region  of north-eastern Togo. The Miyobe language is spoken in Solla.

References

Populated places in Kara Region
Bimah Prefecture